Donna Andrews may refer to:

Donna Andrews (golfer) (born 1967), American golfer
Donna Andrews (author), American mystery fiction writer 
Donna Andrews (EastEnders), a fictional character in the British TV soap opera EastEnders